The men's omnium competition at the 2018 Asian Games was held on 30 August 2018 at the Jakarta International Velodrome.

Schedule
All times are Western Indonesia Time (UTC+07:00)

Results
Legend
DNF — Did not finish

Scratch race

Tempo race

Elimination race

Points race

Summary

References

Track Men omnium